Susan L. Brantley (born 1958) is an American geologist and geochemist who is the Dr. Hubert Barnes and Dr. Mary Barnes Professor at Pennsylvania State University. Her research dominantly studies interactions between fluids and minerals at low temperatures, biological reactions in water-rich fluids within soils, and the geochemical processes that convert rock into soil. However, among many other topics, she has also published work on carbon dioxide emissions from volcanoes, and the environmental impact of shale gas extraction and nuclear waste disposal. During her career, Brantley has published over 200 research papers and book chapters, has been awarded academic prizes and fellowships by many of the world's leading geoscience societies, and has been described as "one of the leading aqueous geochemists of her generation."

Awards and recognition

Fellowships and memberships
 Fellow of the American Geophysical Union
 Fellow of the Geological Society of America
 Fellow of the Geochemical Society
 Fellow of the European Association of Geochemistry
 Fellow of the International Association of GeoChemistry
 Member of the National Academy of Sciences

Professional awards
 Robert Garrels Award, The Geobiology Society (2019)
Urey Medal of the European Association of Geochemistry (2018)
 Geochemistry Division Medal of the American Chemical Society (2017)
 Wollaston Medal of the Geological Society of London (2016)
Honorary Doctorate, University of Lausanne, Switzerland (2013)
 Presidential Award of the Soil Science Society of America (2012)
Honorary Doctorate, University of Toulouse III - Paul Sabatier University, France (2011)
 Arthur L. Day Medal of the Geological Society of America (2011)

References

Living people
Date of birth missing (living people)
American geochemists
American women geologists
Pennsylvania State University faculty
Princeton University alumni
Fellows of the American Geophysical Union
Members of the United States National Academy of Sciences
Wollaston Medal winners
21st-century American geologists
21st-century American scientists
21st-century American women scientists
1958 births
American women academics
Presidents of the Geochemical Society